O with left notch is a letter of the Cyrillic script. it was used in 's Bashkir alphabet.